Rebecca Ferguson (born 1983) is a Swedish actress.

Rebecca Ferguson may also refer to:

 Rebecca Ferguson (singer) (born 1986), English singer-songwriter
 Rebecca Ferguson, camogie player in 2011 All-Ireland Colleges Camogie Championship

See also
Rebecca Ferguson Stone, character in the film, Parallel Lives